The Savage Playground is the fourth studio album by Swedish glam metal band Crashdïet. The same name as the Canadian Hard Rock band "Savage Playground". The album was released on 22 January 2013. It is the second album to feature Simon Cruz as the band's lead singer.  It is the first Crashdiet album to feature the same lead singer as its predecessor (Generation Wild), as Dave Lepard committed suicide after their first album, Rest In Sleaze, and H. Olliver Twisted left after the band's second album The Unattractive Revolution.

The first single from "The Savage Playground" was "Cocaine Cowboys", released on 14 December 2012 worldwide on iTunes.   Due to an iTunes error, "Cocaine Cowboys" was released on the American iTunes store ten days early, on 4 December 2012. The music video "Cocaine Cowboys" which was released a week after the single, was directed by Richard Frantzen, and ends with the band being gunned down. As of January 2013 a music video (also directed by Frantzen) for "California" has also been filmed but not released.

The original record features 13 songs, though the iTunes version features an extra track titled "Liquid Jesus".

Track listing

Bonus 
"Liquid Jesus" iTunes
"Night Hellride" Japan

Singles 
"Cocaine Cowboys"
"California"

Personnel
 Simon Cruz – vocals, harmonica
 Martin Sweet – guitar
 Peter London – bass
 Eric Young – drums

References

2013 albums
Crashdïet albums